Carlos Montez Melancia (21 August 1927 – 23 October 2022) was a Portuguese politician who was the Governor of Macau from 9 July 1987 to 22 April 1992.

Biography
Melancia was born in Alpiarça, Santarém District, Portugal in 1927. In 1992, his alleged corruption affairs were published in the media. He was subsequently indicted for suspected bribe taking by the Prosecutor General of the Republic, thus causing him to resign from the post in that year. Melancia was later acquitted and found innocent of all charges by the Portuguese Supreme Court in 2002. He also served as Minister of Industry and Technology (1976–1978) and Minister of the Sea (1983–1985).

Melancia was the godson of José Relvas, a key figure of the 5 October 1910 revolution and prominent politician in the First Portuguese Republic. Carlos Melancia died on 23 October 2022, at the age of 95.

See also
 Portuguese Macau

References

1927 births
2022 deaths
Governors of Macau
Members of the Assembly of the Republic (Portugal)
People from Alpiarça